Oinafa is one of the seven districts on the island of in Rotuma, a dependency of Fiji. It includes the villages of Oinafa, Lopta, and Paptea.

References

Districts of Rotuma